Ne is a comune (municipality) in the Metropolitan City of Genoa in the Italian region Liguria, located in the Val Graveglia about  east of Genoa. It is formed by several distinct burghs, or frazioni.

History
It adjoins the valley of Graveglia, the ancient realm of Garibald, the king of the Lombards who fled from Lombardy in 673.

The family of the founder of the modern, united Italian state, Giuseppe Garibaldi, originated in the nearby valley of Graveglia. A monument to Garibaldi is located in Conscenti, one of Ne's 16 frazione, or hamlets, and the comune's seat of government. Most of these frazione originated as castles built during and after the tenth century as defenses against Saracen raids.

Main sights
Ne's landscape is naturally partitioned by the bottom of the Graveglia valley, the Graveglia river, and the high pastures and woods.

Natural attractions  include:
Views of Mount Chiappozzo, Mount Porcile, and the Biscia Pass.
The thousand-year-old oak tree of Gosita, in the frazione Zerli.
A network of high-altitude paths, pedestrian and carriage roads for trekking and mountain biking, which afford striking views of the southern part of the Aveto Natural Regional Park.
The caves of Tana di Cà Freghé.
Geological formations known as "the pillows".
The Gambatesa Mine, the largest manganese mine in Europe, which is visitable via tram.

Other attractions include:
Traces of pre-Roman settlements at Statale.
Cassagna, a medieval stone village reachable on foot through the Ponte Cambiaso, a bridge built in 1766 on top of a  precipice.

References

External links
 Official website

Cities and towns in Liguria